Tadeo Czerweny S.A. is an Argentinian manufacturer of transformers and other high-power electrical equipment founded by Tadeo Czerweny in 1958.

In 1985 they entered microcomputer field as Czerweny Electrónica, by marketing three rebranded Timex Sinclair models assembled in Argentina: the CZ 1000, CZ 1500 and CZ 2000. 

These machines had their hardware supplied by Timex Portugal, the portuguese branch of Timex Sinclair. Since Czerweny computers used Timex Sinclair chips and ROMs, their compatibility was close to 100% relative to the original Sinclair machines. They also look similar to the original Timex models. The CZ 1000 was a relabled Timex Sinclair 1000, the CZ 1500 was similar to the Timex Sinclair 1500 and the CZ 2000 is a Spectrum compatible in a Timex Sinclair 1500 case.

Afterwards, imported components were replaced with locally produced variants, and extra modifications were added, like a joystick port, composite monitor output and a restart button. This gave origin to new models, released in 1986 with original Czerweny cases: CZ 1000 Plus, CZ 1500 Plus, CZ Spectrum and CZ Spectrum Plus. About 4000 machines were produced each month. Czerweny models competed in Argentina with the Brazilian TK 83, 85, 90x and genuine Sinclair machines, but were more successful. 

The Paraná, Entre Rios province factory was destroyed by a fire in 1986, eventually ending Czerweny computer production.

Machines 

 CZ 1000 - Relabled Timex Sinclair 1000 (ZX81 clone with 2KB RAM).
 CZ 1500 - Relabled Timex Sinclair 1500 (ZX81 clone with 16KB RAM).
 CZ 2000 - Uses a black version of the CZ 1500 case, with a ZX Spectrum rainbow logo added (ZX Spectrum clone).
 CZ 1000 Plus - A CZ 1000 in a similar case to the ZX Spectrum with rubber keys, adding two joystick ports, composite monitor out and a reset button.
 CZ 1500 Plus - A CZ 1500 with the same improvements as the CZ 1000 Plus.
 CZ Spectrum - A CZ 2000 with the same improvements as the CZ 1000 Plus in a larger box.
 CZ Spectrum Plus - A Sinclair ZX Spectrum clone in a Spectrum+ box, with added joystick ports, composite monitor out, a reset button and Sinclair BASIC messages were translated into Spanish.

References 

Z80-based home computers
Sinclair ZX81 clones
ZX Spectrum clones